Danielle Godet (1927–2009) was a French stage and film actress.

Partial filmography

 The Man Without a Name (1943) - Une figurante
 The Idiot (1946)
 Man About Town (1947) - Une spectatrice
 Ploum, ploum, tra-la-la (1947) - Gisèle
 The Idol (1948) - Françoise
 Une femme par jour (1949) - Sabine - la fiancée de Guy
 La souricière (1950) - Jacqueline
 Night Taxi (1950) - Laura Morani
 The Elusive Pimpernel (1950) - Suzanne de Tournai
 Paris Vice Squad (1951) - Madeleine, la secrétaire du commissaire Basquier
 Nous irons à Monte-Carlo (1951) - Jacqueline Chatenay-Maillard
 Les mousquetaires du roi (1951)
 Double or Quits (1953) - Marie Chassagne
 The Three Musketeers (1953) - Constance Bonacieux
 Boum sur Paris (1953) - Hélène
 Adventures of the Barber of Seville (1954) - Rosina
 Yours Truly, Blake (1954) - Michèle Marley / Marion Miller
 Chéri-Bibi (1955) - Cécily du Touchais
 Ces sacrées vacances (1956) - Gina Carigan
 C'est une fille de Paname (1957) - Lyane Grandhomme
 Paris clandestin (1957) - Francine
 Le souffle du désir (1958) - Christiane Méry
 Cuatro en la frontera (1958) - Olivia
 Arènes joyeuses (1958) - Marina
 Rapt au Deuxième Bureau (1958) - Vera Lérins
 Nuits de Pigalle (1959) - Annie Pervenche
 Ce soir on tue (1959) - Colette
 Muerte al amanecer (1959) - Linette
 Un couple (1960) - Christine
 The Versailles Affair (1960) - Gina
 Amour, autocar et boîtes de nuit (1960) - Georgette
 Queen of the Tabarin Club (1960) - Monique
 Captain Fracasse (1961) - Serafina
 Les honneurs de la guerre (1961) - Mademoiselle Lherminier
 The Fabiani Affair (1962) - Monique
 Autopsy of a Criminal (1963) - Nelsie
 Kiss Kiss, Kill Kill (1966) - Pat
 Only a Coffin (1967) - Greta
 That Splendid November (1969) - Elisa
 Caméléons (1971) - Sonia
 Quartier de femmes (1973) - Emilia Franval
 Dirty Dreamer (1978) - La dame de la villa
 Joy (1983) - Joy's mother

References

Bibliography
 Christopher Lloyd. Henri-Georges Clouzot. Manchester University Press, 2007.

External links

1927 births
2009 deaths
French film actresses
French stage actresses
Actresses from Paris
20th-century French actresses